Jill Daley (born 1976/77) is a Scottish broadcaster, model and journalist who lost her sight at the age of 19 to a condition called diabetic retinopathy. She presents The Daily Lunch, a weekday lunchtime show on Glasgow's Insight Radio, a radio station for visually impaired listeners. Daley worked as a blind adviser for director Eleanor Yule and producer Oscar van Heek for the film Blinded. Yule and van Heek intend to make a film about Daley's life. In November 2014, she appeared in an episode of BBC Radio Scotland's Skin Deep discussing beauty and body image issues for people with sight loss.

References

External links
It's a disability thing BBC (9 September 2009)
Jill Daley interview RNIB Action for Blind People
Daily Lunch and podcasts RNIB's Insight Radio

1970s births
Year of birth missing (living people)
Living people
Scottish radio personalities
Scottish female models
Scottish journalists
Scottish blind people